Miss Malaysia Universe 2006, the 40th edition of the Miss Universe Malaysia, was held on 19 April 2006 at Royale Chulan Hotel, Kuala Lumpur. Melissa Tan of Malacca was crowned by the outgoing titleholder, Angela Gan of Sabah at the end of the event. She then represented Malaysia at the Miss Universe 2006 pageant in Los Angeles, United States.

Results

References 

2006 in Malaysia
2006 beauty pageants
2006